Red Kaweah is a mountain in California's Sequoia National Park on the Kaweah Peaks Ridge. It is 
north of Mount Kaweah and 
south of Black Kaweah.

References

External links 
 

Mountains of Sequoia National Park
Mountains of Tulare County, California
Mountains of Northern California